Autosticha sinica is a moth in the family Autostichidae. It was described by Kyu-Tek Park and Chun-Sheng Wu in 2003. It is found in Sichuan, China.

The wingspan is 17–18 mm. The forewings are densely covered with pale brownish-orange scales and there are two large spots at the subbasal area. The discal stigmata are blackish, the first at the middle, the plical below the first and the second largest at the end of the cell. There are marginal dots along the costa and termen. The hindwings are pale brownish grey.

References

Moths described in 2003
Autosticha
Moths of Asia